Le Sauze-du-Lac (literally Le Sauze of the Lake) is a commune in the Hautes-Alpes department in southeastern France.

Population

History
Le Sauze du Lac, previously just Le Sauze, is located above the Lac de Serre Poncon. The village was moved after its original site was flooded by the lake in the early 1960s.

Geography
Le Sauze sits above the two branches of the Lac de Serre Poncon, previously the confluence of the Ubaye and Durance rivers. It sits below the Grand Morgon mountain.

See also
Communes of the Hautes-Alpes department

References

External links
 Mairie du Sauze-du-lac - Site officiel

Communes of Hautes-Alpes